Partners Creek (also known as Parlners Creek or Partner's Creek) is a tributary of Tunkhannock Creek in Susquehanna County, Pennsylvania, in the United States. The creek has one named tributary, which is known as Sterling Brook. The drainage basin of Partners Creek is classified as a Coldwater Fishery and a Migratory Fishery. The surficial geology in the vicinity of the creek consists of Wisconsinan Till, alluvium, bedrock, wetlands, lakes, and alluvial fan.

Course
Partners Creek begins in a lake in Harford Township. It flows south-southwest for several tenths of a mile, crossing Pennsylvania Route 547 and entering a valley. It then turns south for a few tenths of a mile before turning south-southeast and entering a wetland with a lake. The creek then turns south for several tenths of a mile before turning south-southeast and then east-southeast. After a few tenths of a mile, it passes through a wetland, where it turns south-southeast and enters Lenox Township. Here, the creek passes through Acre Pond before turning south. After several tenths of a mile, it turns southeast for several tenths of a mile before receiving its only named tributary, Sterling Brook, from the left. The creek then turns south for more than a mile before turning southeast and reaching the end of its valley. A short distance further downstream, it crosses Pennsylvania Route 92 and reaches its confluence with Tunkhannock Creek.

Tributaries
Partners Creek has one named tributary, which is known as Sterling Brook.

Geography and geology

The surficial geology at the mouth of Partners Creek consists of alluvial fan. Further upstream, the surficial geology mainly consists of a till known as Wisconsinan Till, but there are large patches of alluvium and bedrock consisting of sandstone and shale in the area. There are also patches of wetlands and lakes, including one known as Acre Pond.

A dam known as Acre Pond Dam is situated on Partners Creek. In August 1981, it was classified as being in fair condition. The dam does not have a spillway capable of withstanding a 100 year flood, and thus often experiences overtopping. Because of this, and because a few lives could be lost in the event of a dam failure, it was classified as a "significant hazard dam". While there was some leakage through the dam, no signs of structural instability were observed.

Watershed and biology
The mouth of the creek is in the United States Geological Survey quadrangle of Lenoxville. However, its source is in the quadrangle of Harford. The creek's mouth is located near Lenox.

Williams Field Services Company, LLC has received a permit to build, maintain, and operate a  natural gas pipeline crossing Partners Creekimpacting  of the creekand one of its unnamed tributaries.

The drainage basin of Partners Creek is classified as a Coldwater Fishery and a Migratory Fishery.

History
Partners Creek was entered into the Geographic Names Information System on August 2, 1979. Its identifier in the Geographic Names Information System is 1183350. The creek is also known as Parlners Creek or Partner's Creek. The former variant name comes from Israel C. White's 1881 book The geology of Susquehanna County and Wayne County, Pennsylvania. The source of the latter variant name is unknown.

See also
Tower Branch, next tributary of Tunkhannock Creek going downstream
Nine Partners Creek, next tributary of Tunkhannock Creek going upstream
List of rivers of Pennsylvania

References

Rivers of Susquehanna County, Pennsylvania
Tributaries of Tunkhannock Creek
Rivers of Pennsylvania